Neurology is a weekly peer-reviewed medical journal covering research in neurology. It is published by Wolters Kluwer on behalf of the American Academy of Neurology, of which it is the official journal. It has been edited since April 2020 by José G. Merino (Georgetown University).

Previous editors-in-chief
The following persons have been editors-in-chief:
 Russell N. DeJong (1951-1977; University of Michigan Medical School), founding editor-in-chief
 Lewis P. Rowland (1977-1987; Columbia University)
 Robert B. Daroff (1987-1997; Case Western Reserve University School of Medicine)
 Robert C. Griggs (1997-2007; University of Rochester Medical Center)
 John H. Noseworthy (2007-2009; Mayo Clinic)
 Robert A. Gross (2009-2020; University of Rochester Medical Center)

Abstracting and indexing
The journal is abstracted and indexed in:

According to the Journal Citation Reports by Clarivate, the journal has a 2022 impact factor of 11.8.

References

External links
 

Neurology journals
Publications established in 1951
Wolters Kluwer academic journals
Academic journals associated with learned and professional societies
Biweekly journals
English-language journals